Puthan Naduvakkatt Chenthamaraksha Menon, also known as P. N. C. Menon (born 12 December 1948) is an Indian-born Omani billionaire businessman hailing from Palakkad in Kerala. He is the founder and chairman of Sobha Ltd (Formerly Sobha Developers Ltd)& Sobha LLC.

Biography
Menon was born on 12 December 1948
. As his father was doing business in Thrissur, he grew and studied there. At the age of 10, he lost his father. Afterwards, he dropped out of Sree Kerala Varma College, Thrissur, to do interior decoration business without completing his education.

At the age of 26, he left Kerala for Oman, where over the years he developed his interior decoration business into  a profitable venture. In 1995, he started Sobha Ltd. in Bangalore named after his wife. He is married to Sobha and they have three children: two daughters, Bindu and Revathi, and one son Ravi Menon

Philanthropy

P. N. C. Menon, established the Sri Kurumba Educational & Charitable Trust in 1994, a year before he founded Sobha Developers. The trust adopted Vadakkencherry and Kizhakkancherry - two Panchayats each consisting 2 villages in Palakkad district, Kerala, his native state, in 2006. In the adopted villages, the trust helps families with very low monthly income and provides education to children from 2,500 poor families (about 11000 people).

Menon and his wife Sobha joined The Giving Pledge list a philanthropic initiative started by Warren Buffett, former Microsoft chairman Bill Gates and his wife Melinda.

Awards and honours

2015: Arabian Indian Czar Award from News Channel Times Now 
 2015: Management Leadership Excellence Award from Calicut Management Association
2014:  Golden Peacock Lifetime Achievement Award for Business Leadership from Golden Peacock Awards  
 2014:  Dhanam Lifetime Achievement Award from Business Magazine Dhanam   
 2014:  Malayalee Business Achiever Award  from  Pegasus Group  
 2014:  Featured among top businessmen on Faces of UAE https://facesofuae.com/faces/pnc-menon (formerly Faces of Dubai) 
 2014: Excellence in Business Award for corporate Social Responsibility by The Times of India 
 2013: Business Man of the Year from State Forum of Bankers Clubs Kerala 
2013: 4th Rank in Top 100 Indians in UAE by Forbes
 2013: Lifetime Achievement Award, from NDTV
 2012: Special Recognition for "Dedicated Service to Civil Engineering and the Construction Industry" - Civil-Aid Techno Clinic Pvt. Ltd.
2009: Pravasi Bharatiya Samman, by the Government of India

References

Living people
1948 births
Businesspeople from Thrissur
Indian industrialists
Indian emigrants to Oman
Omani billionaires
Recipients of Pravasi Bharatiya Samman